Thattil Antony Johnson (26 March 1953 – 18 August 2011), popularly known as Johnson Master, was an Indian film score composer and music director who has given music to some of the most important motion pictures of Malayalam cinema, including those for Koodevide, Namukku Paarkkan Munthiri Thoppukal, Oru Minnaminunginte Nurunguvettam, Vadakkunokkiyantram, Perumthachan, Njan Gandharvan, Ponthan Mada, and Bhoothakkannadi. Regarded as one of the finest composers in the industry, he was noted for his lyrical and expressive melodies together with simple but rich tonal compositions of thematic music. Johnson is a recipient of National Film Awards twice and Kerala State Film Awards five times.

After completing B. Com from St. Thomas College, Thrissur, Johnson started his career as an assistant to G. Devarajan in the 1970s, and debuted as an independent composer in late seventies with Aaravam. He was a recurrent collaborator for directors Padmarajan, Bharathan, Sathyan Anthikkad, T. V. Chandran, Kamal, Lohithadas, Balachandra Menon and Mohan. He has composed music for more than 300 Malayalam films, the most by any composer except for Devarajan. He was the first music director from Malayalam cinema to be honoured with the National film Awards. He died of a heart attack in Chennai on 18 August 2011.

Early life

Johnson was born in Nellikkunnu near Trichur (Thrissur) in the state of Travancore-Cochin (now part of Kerala), on 26 March 1953. His father, the late Thattil Antony, was a bank employee. His secondary education was at St. Thomas School in Thope, Trichur. Johnson was a singer in the choir of Nellikkunnu St. Sebastian's Church. He obtained training in guitar and harmonium from his colleagues during this early periods itself. He used to sing in youth festivals and musical shows and joined the orchestra team of some local troupes and played harmonium in many concerts. He also used to sing in female voice in ganamelas (a stage show where film songs are sung by local or professional artists).

In 1968, Johnson and his friends formed a club named Voice of Thrissur. Johnson was the main instrumentalist in the club where he played wide varieties of instruments – guitar, harmonium, flute, drums and violin.

Within a few years, the club became one of the most sought after musical troupes in Kerala, and had more than fifty members. This club used to give accompaniment music to playback singers Jayachandran and Madhuri in their musical shows. It was Jayachandran who introduced Johnson to G. Devarajan, one of the most prolific composers of South Indian cinema then. Devarajan literally adopted Johnson and brought him to Chennai in 1974. Johnson bought an accordion, during this period, from R. K. Shekhar (A. R. Rahman's father), and began assisting Devarajan in filmscoring and composing.

Film scoring and soundtracks

Johnson began his independent career by composing the film scores of Bharathan's Aaravam (1978), Thakara (1980) and Chamaram (1980). He composed his first soundtracks for the film Inaye Thedi, debut film of director turned still photographer Antony Eastman and actress Silk Smitha. It was Devarajan himself, who suggested Johnson to the director. Then came Bharathan's Parvathi and Balachandra Menon's Premageethangal. Premageethangal was a notable success with four of its songs – "Swapnam Verumoru Swapnam", "Nee Nirayoo Jeevanil", "Muthum Mudipponnum" and  "Kalakalamozhi" attaining cult status.

He came to prominence through his collaboration with Malayalam author and director Padmarajan. Koodevide was their first venture, which had one of the most famous songs of Johnson "Aadivaa Kaatte", a pathbreaking song in Malayalam music history. It was one of the first songs in Malayalam to so many western classical elements. The song was born out of Padmarajan's need for a western song for his innovative film. Song composition took place in Woodland's Hotel, Chennai. Another notable feature of this song was the lyrics by O. N. V. Kurup, who for the first time wrote lyrics for a pre-composed song. Johnson worked for 11 films with Padmarajan, including his last film Njan Gandharvan. This productive collaboration saw the detailed screenplay and cinematography of Padmarajan become a fertile ground for expressive musical narration and thematic scores for Johnson. This is seen in some of the greatest motion pictures of Malayalam cinema, like Nombarathipoovu (1987). Another notable collaboration of Johnson was with director Sathyan Anthikkad, with whom he associated in almost 25 films. He was able to provide some of his most popular songs with Anthikkad and this combo is widely accepted to be one of the greatest director-composer collaborations in Malayalam cinema. Acclaimed Malayalam director Bharathan also collaborated with him in multiple films including Parvathy, Palangal, Ormakkayi, Kattathe Kilikkoodu, Ente Upasana, Oru Minnaminunginte Nurunguvettam, Ozhivukalam, Malootty, Chamayam and Churam. His major other collaborations with directors include Mohan (Oru Katha Oru Nunakkatha, Sakshyam, Pakshe and Angane Oru Avadhikkalathu), Sibi Malayil (Kireedam, Chenkol, Dasaratham and Nee Varuvolam), Sreenivasan (Vadakkunokkiyantram and Chinthavishtayaya Shyamala), Lohithadas (Bhoothakkannadi, Kamal (Peruvannapurathe Visheshangal, Shubhayathra, Ee Puzhayum Kadannu and Paavam Paavam Rajakumaran), and Balachandra Menon (Shesham Kazhchayil, Premageethangal, Kilukilukkam, Kelkatha Shabdam and Nayam Vyakthamakkunnu).

He is also noted for his collaboration with the Malayalam lyricist Kaithapram Damodaran Namboothiri. Their association began in 1989 with Sathyan Anthikkad's social satire Varavelpu. Most of Johnson's notable works were in the late eighties and early nineties. In 1991, he scored a record number of 31 films, including 29 with Kaithapram. Johnson won National awards for two consecutive years. He won his first National Award for best music direction for the motion picture Ponthan Mada (1993). The next year he got his second National award for Sukrutham for the background score.

After an extremely successful career of more than a decade, Johnson took a sabbatical from film scoring by the end of the nineties. The quantity of his works began perishing during this time. By the beginning of the 2000s, he didn't sign any new projects that even his most noted collaborator Sathyan Anthikkad had to find a new composer. In 2003 he did the background score for the NFDC movie Parinamam (The Change) directed by P. Venu.In 2004, he sang the song "Theekuruvi" from Kangalal Kaidhu Sei, which was composed by A. R. Rahman. Perhaps it is the only song recorded by him for any composer other than himself. He returned strongly to the field with Photographer in 2006, which fetched him numerous awards.

Non-cinematic outputs

Johnson has released four non-film albums. His first album Sneha Deepika was released in 1989 on Tharangini audios. It had nine Christian devotional songs – "Aathma Swaroopa", "Unni Yesu Pirannu", "Manninum Poovinum", "Thumbapoo Polulla", "Bhoomikku Pulakam", "Manassakumengil", "Kulir Choodum", "Arthungal Innoru" and "Vidarnna Punchiri". The featured artists were K. J. Yesudas, K. S. Chithra and Sujatha. His second album Onathappan, a collaboration with M. G. Radhakrishnan and Berny-Ignatius, consisted of nine festival songs. The track "Mundon Paadam" was composed by Johnson, sung by M. G. Sreekumar and had lyrics penned by Bichu Thirumala. His third album Nannipoorvam Johnson, consisted of twelve tracks – "Chandanakkavilinnu", "Panineeru Peyyum", "Vasundhare", "Virunnu Vanna", "Prapanjam Sundaram", "Enthe Nee Varathe", "Nilasandhyayil", "Veruthe Onnu", "Ponnazhikkuttu", "Pranayappirave", "Kalindhi", and an introductory speech by Sreenivasan. The lyricists were R. K. Damodaran, Gireesh Puthenchery, Kaithapram, Bichu Thirumala, M. D. Rajendran, K. Jayakumar, S. Ramesan Nair and Poovachal Khader and the songs were rendered by K. J. Yesudas, P. Jayachandran, K. S. Chithra, M. G. Sreekumar, Aparna Rajeev, Dr. Rashmi Madhu and Johnson himself. In 2009, he released his second Christian devotional album entitled Parishudhan. It had eleven tracks – "Vazhiyum Sathyavum Nee Thanne (Vijay Yesudas), "Mullukal Kuthi" (Chithra), "Ariyathe Polum" (G. Venugopal), "Neethimanayavane" (Sujatha), "Traditional song" (Louis), "Mazhayum Veyilum" (Rimi Tomy), "Oru Viral Sparshathal (Sudheep), "Loka Palaka" (Chithra), Neethanthamam (Vijay Yesudas), and "Kannukalil Theliyum" (Manjari).

Music style and impact

His skilful integration of textual rhythm of the lyrics together with rich tonal arrangement, redefined songwriting in Malayalam cinema, since the late 1980s. In his film scores, Johnson combines native South Indian melodic patterns with the harmonic structure of classical music and this has attained an expressive form of narration through film score. He composed for about 300 films, making him the second most composed music director in Malayalam, after his guru G. Devarajan. Though he has obtained no formal training in classical music, he was able to incorporate the beauty of Carnatic ragas in his songs. Most of his songs were composed on Kalyani raga.

Johnson's favourite male singer was K. J. Yesudas, who has recorded many songs for him, while S. Janaki and K. S. Chithra were his favourite female singers. Chithra had some of her most noted songs with Johnson.

Johnson is fondly called Johnson Master (Johnson Mashu) by Malayalee audiences. Even his contemporaries and competitors refer him with the tag 'Master' ('mash' in Malayalam).

His background scoring style has a cult following. His scores from Thoovanathumbikal, Namukku Parkkan Munthirithoppukal, Manichitrathazhu,   Thaniyavarthanam, Chitram, Bharatham, Aparan, Kireedam, Sukrutham are considered to be amongst the best.

Awards

Johnson won his first National Film Award for the Best Music Direction for the film Ponthan Mada (1994)  and the very next year he won his second National film award for the Best Background score for the film Sukrutham (1995) He was the first Malayalee music composer to receive a National award in music category and is also the only Malayalee music director who received two national awards in music category. This film has one song Adimarunge ayyayya (അടിമരുങ്ങേ അയ്യയ്യാ) lyrics by O. N. V. Kurup and sung by K. S. Chithra and chorus composed by Johnson. This is a folk song. National film award committee noted that he brilliantly integrated western folk tunes into this song. The award was given for best music direction and background score of this film. He has received three Kerala State Film Award for Best Music Director, for the films Ormakkayi (1982), Vadakkunokkiyantram and Mazhavil Kavadi (1989), and Angane Oru Avadhikkalathu (1999). He was awarded the Kerala State Film Award for Best Background Music for the films Sadayam (1992) and Sallapam (1996). He has thus received five Kerala State Film Awards in music category, an achievement he shares with Devarajan. He has received the Kerala Film Critics Awards four times, the most recent in 2008 for Gulmohar. In 2007, he won the Mathruboomi Award for Best Music Director for Photographer (2006). He won the Mullasserry Raju Music Award for the song "Enthe Kannanu Karuppu Niram", also from the same film. In addition, he has received numerous other awards and nominations including Devarajan Master Memorial Award and Raveendran Master Memorial Award.

Death
Johnson died at his home in Chennai on 18 August 2011 at the age of 58, due to a massive heart attack. He was survived by his wife Rani Johnson, son Renn Johnson and daughter Shan Johnson. Renn Johnson died on 25 February 2012 in a motorbike accident in Chennai. Shan Johnson, a trained singer and musician, died of a cardiac arrest at her flat in Chennai on 5 February 2016.

Partial discography

Original scores and soundtracks

Original scores
The following lists out the films in which Johnson composed the background score but not songs.

Aakaashakottayile Sulthaan
Aalorungi Arangorungi
Aaraante Mulla Kochumulla
Aaravam
Aaryan
Arabikkadal
Abhimanyu
Adimachangala
Agnisharam
Ambada Njaane
Amaram
Amrutham
Arayannangalude Veedu
Avidatheppole Ivideyum
Bharatham
Chamaram
Chithram
Chakravalam Chuvannappol
Chithrathoonukal
Dhanam
Dheem Tharikidathom
Ee Kaikalil
Ekantham
English Medium
Ente Hridayathinte Udama
Ente Kaanakkuyil
Ithum Oru Jeevitham
Iniyum Kurukshethram
Kaanaakkinaavu
Kaarunyam
Kaaryam Nissaaram
Kadathanadan Ambadi
Kadaksham
Kamaladalam
Kazhukan
Keli
Kaikudanna Nilavu
Kissan
Kinnarippuzhayoram
Kodumudikal
Koodum Thedi
Krishnapakshakkilikal
Kudumbapuraanam
Kunjaattakkilikal
Maayamayooram
Madhya Venal
Manasiloru Manimuthu
Manichithrathazhu
Mankamma
Mizhineerppoovukal
Mukunthetta Sumitra Vilikkunnu
Mizhi Randilum
Mounanombaram
No. 1 Snehatheeram Bangalore North
Nokketha Dhoorathu Kannum Nattu
Nombarathi Poovu
Nyayavidhi
Orma Mathram
Ottayal Pattaalam
Oru Cheru punchiri
Puzha
Paadamudra
Parinayam
Pooram
Post Box Number 27
Pradakshinam
Raagam Thaanam Pallavi
Shreeraagam
Snehapoorvam Meera
Sukrutham
Susanna
Soorya Gaayathri
Thalavattam
Thazhvaram
Thakara
Thaniyavarthanam
Theekkaattu
Thoovanathumbikal
Uncle Bun
Uthara
Utharam
Vadhu Doctoraanu
Vaadakaveettile Athidhi
Vandanam
Valkannadi
Vellanakalude Nadu
Vedikkett
Venkalam
Vishnulokam

Non-film albums
Rajavu ezhunallunnu – Christian devotional album .Audio by manorama music  (2011)
Parishudhan (2009)
Nannipoorvam Johnson
Onathappan
Sneha Deepika (1989)

Notable songs
In an interview with Malayala Manorama, Johnson listed the following 13 songs as his favourite songs.
 "Aadivaa Katte" (Koodevide)
 "Nee Nirayoo Jeevanil" (Premageethangal)
 "Swapnam Verumoru Swapnam" (Premageethangal)
 "Poo Venam" (Oru Minnaminunginte Nurunguvettam)
 "Melle Melle Mukhapadam" (Oru Minnaminunginte Nurunguvettam)
 "Gopike Nin Viral" (Kattathe Kilikkoodu)
 "Devankanangal" (Njan Gandharvan)
 "Swarna mukile" (Ithu Njangaludey Kadha)
 "Thankathoni" (Mazhavilkavadi)
 "Sundari Poovinu Naanam" (Ente Upasana)
 "Shyamambharam" (Artham)
 "Enthe Kannanu Karuppu Niram" (Photographer)
 "Oru Naal" (Gulmohar)

Accolades

National Film Awards

Kerala State Film Awards

Kerala Film Critics Association Awards

Notes

External links
 
 Johnson at the Malayalam Movie Database
 A list of 700 songs by Johnson
 Johnson Master Passed away
 'കുന്നിമണിച്ചെപ്പ് തുറന്ന് – രവി മേനോന്‍' in Mathrubhumi Online
 'ആരോടും മിണ്ടാതെ' in Mathrubhumi Online
 'ഓര്‍മ്മയ്ക്കായ്' in Manorama Online
 Malayalam film industry never recognized Johnson's worth: G. Venugopal

Musicians from Thrissur
Malayalam film score composers
Best Music Direction National Film Award winners
Best Background Score National Film Award winners
20th-century Indian composers
21st-century Indian composers
Film musicians from Kerala
1953 births
2011 deaths